The Intermediate Geographic Region of Belo Horizonte (code 3101) is one of the 13 intermediate geographic regions in the Brazilian state of Minas Gerais and one of the 134 of Brazil, created by the National Institute of Geography and Statistics (IBGE) in 2017.

It comprises 74 municipalities, distributed in 5 immediate geographic regions:

 Immediate Geographic Region of Belo Horizonte.
 Immediate Geographic Region of Sete Lagoas.
 Immediate Geographic Region of Santa Bárbara-Ouro Preto.
 Immediate Geographic Region of Curvelo.
 Immediate Geographic Region of Itabira.

References 

Geography of Minas Gerais